Bird Box is a 2018 American post-apocalyptic horror thriller film directed by Susanne Bier and written by Eric Heisserer, based on the 2014 novel of the same name by Josh Malerman. The film follows the character Malorie Hayes, played by Sandra Bullock, as she tries to protect herself and two children from entities which cause people who look at them to kill themselves.

Bird Box had its world premiere at the AFI Fest on November 12, 2018, and began a limited release on December 14, before streaming worldwide on Netflix on December 21, 2018. The film received mixed reviews from critics and went on to become the most-watched film on Netflix within 28 days of release, according to Netflix.

Plot

In a post-apocalyptic world, Malorie Hayes informs two young children that they will go down a river in a rowboat. She sternly instructs them not to remove their blindfolds, or they will die.

Five years earlier, a pregnant Malorie is visited by her sister, Jessica. A news broadcast reports unexplained mass suicides spreading across Europe and Asia. After a prenatal checkup, Malorie witnesses a woman smashing her head repeatedly into the hospital window. Others start acting suicidal as well, causing panic and chaos. Afterward, Malorie hurries to leave the scene with Jessica. While steering away from the hospital, Jessica sees something inexplicable that drives her insane and she deliberately crashes her car. She then walks in front of a speeding truck and is killed.

As Malorie flees on foot, a woman invites her into a house for safety. The woman then sees the entity before going into a trance and sitting inside a burning car. A passerby, Tom, picks up Malorie from the street into the house, where six other people are taking shelter. One survivor, Charlie, says that humanity has been judged, and the appearance of demonic entities is a sign of the end times. He also mentions that those spiritual beings have different names in various cultures, such as Aka Manah, Surgat, Huli Jing, and Púca. Those in the house cover all the windows and blindfold themselves whenever they go out. Greg, the house's owner, commits suicide after volunteering to test if it is safe to observe them indirectly through surveillance cameras.

A new pregnant survivor, Olympia, arrives. Half of the group goes to the grocery store Charlie worked at to restock their dwindling food. They drive there in a car with covered windows using GPS navigation system. Malorie gets three pet birds along with their supplies. She notices the entities' presence agitates the birds. Later, Charlie's coworker attacks the group, attempting to force them to look at the creatures. However, Charlie sacrifices himself to save the others. They make it back to the house. Sometime after, Felix and Lucy steal the car and drive away.

Olympia lets a stranger named Gary into the house against Douglas's wishes. Cheryl knocks Douglas out, and the others lock him in the garage. As Olympia and Malorie go into labor simultaneously, Gary works on drawings of the creatures he has seen before. He knocks Tom unconscious and opens the garage door, exposing Douglas to the entities. Gary goes upstairs and rips all the windows' blinds. Olympia fails to look away, and after witnessing the creature, she dives out the window, killing herself. Malorie hides with both newborn babies under a cover while Gary forces Cheryl to look at the entities, causing her to stab herself in the neck with a pair of scissors. Douglas escapes the garage and blindly attempts to kill Gary with a shotgun, wounding him in the process, but Gary kills him with the scissors. Tom begins to recuperate shortly after, fighting Gary over the gun. After Malorie hears a few gunshots, Tom approaches her to say everything is fine.

Five years later, Tom and Malorie live together with the children, called "Boy" and "Girl". They receive transmissions from survivors informing them of a safe community hidden in the forest, accessible only by boat along the river. As they leave their house, a group of unblindfolded survivors attacks them. Tom distracts the assailants so Malorie and the children can flee. He uncovers his eyes and shoots all the attackers, but after seeing the entities, he kills himself.

Malorie and the children go blindfolded down the river on a boat, carrying the birds to warn them of the entities. They encounter several obstacles, including an unblindfolded survivor and river rapids. Soon after the three reach shore, they are separated when Malorie accidentally slides down a hill. The entities use Malorie's voice to trick the kids into taking off their blindfolds. Malorie regains consciousness and tells the children where to find her. They eventually reach the community, a former school for the blind. Malorie releases the birds and finally gives the children names, Tom and Olympia, admitting that she is their mother.

Cast

Production

Development
The film rights to Bird Box were optioned by Universal Pictures in 2013, prior to the book's release. Scott Stuber and Chris Morgan were set to produce the film, with Andy Muschietti attached as director. Eric Heisserer was in negotiations to write the script. In July 2017, after Stuber became head of the feature film division of Netflix, it was announced that Netflix had acquired the rights to the book and would develop the film, with Sandra Bullock and John Malkovich starring. Susanne Bier was announced as the director.

Casting
In July 2017, Sandra Bullock and John Malkovich were cast in the film as Malorie Hayes and Douglas. In October 2017, Danielle Macdonald, Trevante Rhodes, Jacki Weaver, Sarah Paulson, Rosa Salazar, Lil Rel Howery, and Amy Gumenick joined the cast. In November 2017, Machine Gun Kelly and David Dastmalchian were also added.

Filming
Principal photography began in California in October 2017. Wilderness scenes were shot on the Smith River in the far northern part of the state. The house exterior is from a place in Monrovia. Filming partially took place in Santa Cruz, and the final scene was shot at Scripps College in Claremont.

The production used live birds during filming as much as possible, replacing them digitally for sequences when they became "agitated".

The film uses footage of the Lac-Mégantic rail disaster, which caused the death of 47 people in the town of Lac-Mégantic, Quebec, on July 6, 2013. The stock footage was purchased from a vendor and Netflix stated it would stay in the movie even after a request to remove it from survivors of the disaster. Netflix later removed the footage and replaced with an outtake from a canceled U.S. TV series. The same footage was also used in another Netflix production, Travelers, but has since been removed.

Visual effects
The visual effects were created by Industrial Light & Magic and supervised by Marcus Taormina.

Music
Trent Reznor and Atticus Ross (of Nine Inch Nails) were hired to score the film. The soundtrack album itself was released about two weeks after the release of the film, on January 1, 2019. It was first released for sale only on Nine Inch Nails's website, and later on iTunes, Apple Music, Spotify and other platforms. The released version consisted of ten tracks, totalling an hour and six minutes of music. In a statement on the Nine Inch Nails website, Reznor said:

The full version of the soundtrack was released on November 22, 2019, exclusively on a special edition vinyl box set (with a digital download at purchase). The full version contains 13 more tracks and an extra hour of music, resulting in a two-hour (plus six minutes), 23-track album.

In December 2019, Reznor criticized Bird Box producers over their use of his and Ross's music, and the film editor over making an inadequately low mix of the music in the film, calling the experience a "fucking waste of time".

Release

The film had its world premiere at the AFI Fest on November 12, 2018. However, due to the Woolsey Fire that hit California and out of respect for the victims of the Thousand Oaks shooting, Netflix cancelled AFI Fest's red carpet coverage scheduled for the premiere. The film began a limited theatrical run on December 14, 2018, before streaming on Netflix on December 21, 2018.

Reception

Critical response
The website's critical consensus reads, "Bird Box never quite reaches its intriguing potential, but strong acting and an effectively chilly mood offer intermittently creepy compensation." On Metacritic, the film has a weighted average score of 51 out of 100, based on 26 critics, indicating "mixed or average reviews".

Brian Tallerico from RogerEbert.com said, "Most of the problems with Bird Box come back to a thin screenplay, one that too often gives its characters flat, expository dialogue and then writes itself into a corner with a climax that's just silly when it needs to be tense." Writing for Forbes, Sarah Aswell described the movie as one "that embraces everything about the (horror genre) formula, both good and bad—this movie has moments of true, delightful, fright, but it also has some of the corniness and shallowness that many horror movies can't shake." Aisha Harris of The New York Times found the film occasionally riveting but overall disappointing.

Audience viewership
According to Nielsen, Bird Box was watched by nearly 26 million viewers in its first seven days of release in the United States. It also revealed that a significant part of its audience were young – aged 18 to 34 (36%) – female (57%), and either African American (24%) or Latino (22%). Netflix also released its own viewing figure that gave a worldwide audience of more than 45 million in seven days, with views defined by the company as the film streaming for over 70 percent of its time. The viewing figure was claimed to be the best ever for a Netflix film. This audience figure released by Netflix was met with skepticism from some analysts, who cited a lack of independent verification of the view count. In July 2020, Netflix revealed the film had in-fact been watched by 89 million households over its first four weeks of release, the second-most ever for one of their original films. A Barclays study deduced that, had the film received a traditional theatrical release, it would have grossed about $98 million worldwide. Bird Box became the most-watched film on Netflix within 28 days of its release, with 282.02 million hours being viewed. It retained this position until being displaced by Red Notice in 2021.

Accolades

Bird Box blindfold challenge

In Australia, Netflix originally partnered with four Twitch streamers in performing what they called a Bird Box challenge, in which they would play some popular video games while blindfolded. However, the challenge became widely mimicked on the Internet by individuals wearing blindfolds while trying to do ordinary activities, causing injuries to some. In response, Netflix released several messages over social media advising people not to undertake the challenge or hurt themselves. Nevertheless, in January 2019, a 17-year-old girl in a blindfold taking part in the craze drove into oncoming traffic in Utah and crashed her car, prompting state police to issue the same warning as Netflix. YouTube has responded to this issue by updating its community guidelines, and warns content creators not to put minors in harmful situations that may lead to injury, including dangerous stunts, dares, or pranks.

Future
In July 2020, it was announced that a sequel is in development. In March 2021, it was revealed that the feature would be receiving a Spanish-language spin-off film from writers Alex and David Pastor as "the first of multiple local-language Bird Box spinoffs" set in the same universe.

See also
 Blood List

References

External links
  on Netflix
 

2018 films
2018 horror thriller films
2018 science fiction films
2010s English-language films
2010s monster movies
2010s supernatural horror films
2010s supernatural thriller films
American horror thriller films
American monster movies
American post-apocalyptic films
American nonlinear narrative films
American science fiction horror films
American supernatural horror films
American supernatural thriller films
English-language Netflix original films
Films about interracial romance
Films about suicide
Films based on American horror novels
Films based on science fiction novels
Films directed by Susanne Bier
Films produced by Chris Morgan
Films produced by Clayton Townsend
Films scored by Trent Reznor
Films scored by Atticus Ross
Films set in California
Films set in forests
Films set on boats
Films shot in California
Films with screenplays by Eric Heisserer
2010s American films